2010 Regional League Division 2 Bangkok Metropolitan Region is the 2nd season of the League competition since its establishment in 2009. It is in the third tier of the Thai football league system.

The league has been expanded from 10 clubs in 2009 to 13 clubs this season. The league winners and runners up will qualify for the 2010 Regional League Division 2 championship stage.

Changes from last season

Team changes

Promoted clubs

Raj Pracha-Nonthaburi were promoted to the 2010 Thai Division 1 League after winning the 2009 Regional League Division 2 championship pool.

Relegated clubs

Thai Airways-Look Isan were relegated from the 2009 Thai Division 1 League after finishing the season in 15th place.

Relocated clubs

Thai Summit Samut Prakan and Rose Asia Pathum Thani re-located from the Regional League Central-East Division 2009

Renamed clubs

 Bangkok Bravo renamed Bangkok.
 Thai Airways-Ban Bueng renamed Look Isan-Thai Airways.
 Rangsit University renamed Rangsit University JW.
 Rose Asia Pathum Thani renamed Rose Asia United Thanyaburi.
 Thai Summit renamed Thai Summit Samut Prakan.

Expansion clubs

Nonthaburi and North Bangkok College joined the newly expanded league setup.

Removed clubs

Sarawitaya dropped out of the league at the end of the 2009 campaign.

Stadium and locations

Final league table

Results

References

External links
  Football Association of Thailand

Bang
2010